Leo Cato is a politician from Grenada who is serving as Speaker of the House of Representatives of Grenada since 31 August 2022. 

Cato was the chairman of the board of the Grenada Co-operative Nutmeg Association (GCNA). He is also a former public servant in the ministry of education. 

Cato has a master's degree in computer systems design from Kingston University and a PhD in educational technology at Walden University.

References 

Speakers of the House of Representatives of Grenada
Grenadian politicians
Living people
Year of birth missing (living people)
National Democratic Congress (Grenada) politicians
Alumni of Kingston University